Elisabetha may refer to: 
412 Elisabetha, an asteroid
The historical name of Lokutu, Democratic Republic of the Congo